Walter Dale Hess (August 17, 1930 – October 22, 2016) was an American politician, farmer and realtor from Maryland. He served in the Maryland House of Delegates, representing Harford County, from 1955 to 1970.

Early life
Walter Dale Hess was born on August 17, 1930, in Fallston, Maryland, to Anita Chenworth and St. Clair Hess. He attended Harford County Public Schools. He graduated from Bel Air High School in 1947.

Career
Hess was a Democratic. Hess served in the Maryland House of Delegates, representing Harford County, from 1955 to 1970. He was the majority floor leader from 1963 to 1966 and the majority whip from 1967 to 1968.

After leaving the House of Delegates, he became vice president of Tidewater Insurance. In 1977, Hess was convicted of mail fraud and racketeering. He was sentenced to three years in prison, but the charges were dropped in federal appeals court. After prison, he founded a bank in York, Pennsylvania.

Hess was a farmer and realtor. He held interests in land, motels, apartments and shopping centers in Harford County. He served as president of the Harford County Democratic Club. He served as national vice president of Futures Farmers of America.

Personal life
Hess married Marie Ritchie. They had four children.

Hess died from complications of cancer on October 22, 2016, at his home in Fallston.

References

1930 births
2016 deaths
People from Fallston, Maryland
Democratic Party members of the Maryland House of Delegates
American real estate businesspeople
Farmers from Maryland
American people convicted of mail and wire fraud
People acquitted of racketeering